Stephanie Gehrlein (born 10 April 1982) is a retired German tennis player.

Gehrlein won seven singles titles on the ITF Circuit in her career. On 14 June 2004, she reached her best singles ranking of world No. 121. On 23 October 2000, she peaked at No. 544 in the WTA doubles rankings.

Gehrlein retired from professional tennis 2010.

ITF finals

Singles (7–3)

References

External links
 
 

1982 births
Living people
German female tennis players
Sportspeople from Karlsruhe
Tennis people from Baden-Württemberg